The Golden Spin of Zagreb is an annual senior-level figure skating competition, held yearly in Zagreb, Croatia. It became part of the ISU Challenger Series in the 2014–15 season. Medals are awarded in the disciplines of men's singles, ladies' singles, pair skating, and ice dancing, although, in some years, not every discipline is included. The equivalent for junior-level (and below) skaters is the Golden Bear of Zagreb.

The Golden Spin of Zagreb was first held in December 1967. In 2001, it served as the qualifying competition for the 2002 Winter Olympics.

Senior medalists
CS: ISU Challenger Series

Men

Ladies

Pairs

Ice dancing

Junior medalists

Men

Ladies

Pairs

Ice dancing

References

External links
 

 
ISU Challenger Series
International figure skating competitions hosted by Croatia
Figure skating in Croatia
Sport in Zagreb
Recurring sporting events established in 1967
1967 establishments in Croatia